Music from Chicago was a program broadcast on the DuMont Television Network from WGN-TV in Chicago on Sundays. The 30-minute show first aired April 15, 1951, and the last show aired June 17, 1951.

Episode status
As with most DuMont series, no episodes are known to exist.

Bibliography
David Weinstein, The Forgotten Network: DuMont and the Birth of American Television (Philadelphia: Temple University Press, 2004) 
Alex McNeil, Total Television, Fourth edition (New York: Penguin Books, 1980) 
Tim Brooks and Earle Marsh, The Complete Directory to Prime Time Network TV Shows, Third edition (New York: Ballantine Books, 1964)

See also
List of programs broadcast by the DuMont Television Network
List of surviving DuMont Television Network broadcasts
The Music Show
This Is Music
Concert Tonight

References

External links
 
DuMont historical website

DuMont Television Network original programming
1951 American television series debuts
1951 American television series endings
1950s American variety television series
Black-and-white American television shows
Lost television shows
Chicago television shows